Bimbo Jet was a French euro disco group led by Claude Morgan and Laurent Rossi (22 May 1948 – 20 August 2015), that gained international fame during the summers of 1974 and 1975 with the song "El Bimbo". "El Bimbo" is popular with street musicians and orchestral composers alike, with Paul Mauriat having capitalized well from his own instrumental arrangement in 1975. The song, in a tango arrangement, was also heard in four of the seven Police Academy films starting from the first film up until Police Academy 4: Citizens on Patrol as the tango song in the Blue Oyster Bar scenes.

The song "El Bimbo" is used as a theme song for a 1977 Soviet-made anti-war short film named "Polygon" directed by Anatoly Petrov and written by Sever Gansovsky. The lyrics for "El Bimbo" were written by Hal Shaper.

"El Bimbo" was released in France in June 1974 on the Pathe-Marconi record label, and in the UK in August 1975. The track went to #1 in France and #12 in the UK Singles Chart. It sold 1.3 million copies in France alone, and throughout the world over three million discs. As well as in France, the tune topped charts in Spain, Italy, Denmark, Turkey. and Lebanon. In Argentina, it was #2, and was a chart hit in Belgium, Switzerland, Mexico, and the United States. The record reached #1 in the Billboard Disco Singles, #5 on the Disco File Top 20 chart, and #43 in the Hot 100 charts in the U.S. In Canada, the song reached #77 in the Top Singles chart, and #31 in the Pop Music Playlist.

The group had another hit in mid-1975, particularly in France, with "La Balanga."

Laurent Rossi died of a heart attack on 20 August 2015, at age 67. He was the son of singer Tino Rossi.

Cover versions
 An instrumental cover version was recorded by Mescherin's Orchestra's Orchestra in the 1970s. This version was often used on Soviet TV as an interlude and was released in compilation album easyUSSR (Лёгкие, LG-006-4), published also in Ukraine.
 Greek singer Yiannis Parios had a hit cover version, in the Greek language "Pote Den Se Xehno" in the mid-1970s.
 The singer Marion released a single (Decca Records, 6.11 574 (AC)) with lyrics by Gerd Thumser, published in Germany in 1974, the album titled El bimbo in 1975 was published in Finland (EMI Records, 5E 246-35080), which had the song "El bimbo" as its opening track, with lyrics translated by Pertti Reponen. The album was the best-selling album in Finland for five weeks. It has sold over 52 000 copies, reaching platinum status. El bimbo is Marion's best-selling album throughout her career.

References

External links
 
 

French pop music groups
Eurodisco groups